Tomasz Wołek (14 October 1947 – 21 September 2022) was a Polish sports journalist and writer.

Wołek attended the University of Gdańsk and graduated with a degree in history.

Books
 Copa America
 Mexico Catolico

Awards
 Kisiel Prize (1997)
 Knight's Cross of the Order of Polonia Restituta (2011)

References

1947 births
2022 deaths
Polish journalists
Polish sports journalists
People from Gdańsk
Recipients of the Order of Polonia Restituta